The Museum of Polo and Hall of Fame is a 501(c)(3), non-profit organization to celebrate the sport of polo.

Overview
It was founded by four polo players, H. Jeremy Chisholm, Philip L. B. Iglehart, Leverett S. Miller, and George C. Sherman, Jr. in Lexington, Kentucky in 1988. The first inductions into the hall of fame were in 1990. In 1997, it was relocated to a ten-acre estate in Lake Worth, Florida.

The museum includes a trophy by Paul Storr and paintings by Franklin Brooke Voss, George Derville Rowlandson and Paul Brown.

Honorees
See footnote

Rodolphe Louis Agassiz (1871-1933)
Mariano Aguerre
Lester Armour, III
Michael V. Azzaro
Harold A. Barry
Harold L. Barry
Paul W. Barry
Roy M. Barry
Carlton Beal
James Gordon Bennett, Jr.
Robert D. Beveridge
Elmer Julius Boeseke, Jr.
George Herbert Bostwick
Norman Brinker
Paul Butler (polo)
Delmar Carroll
Clarence C. Combs, Jr.
Alan L. Corey, Jr.
John Elliott Cowdin
Fred W. Dailey
Bart Evans (polo)
Hector Galindo
Elbridge T. Gerry, Sr.
Stephen M. Gose
Carlos Gracida
Guillermo Gracida, Jr.
Raymond R. Guest
Winston Frederick Churchill Guest (1906-1982)
Bennie Gutierrez
George Haas, Jr.
W. Averell Harriman (1891-1986)
W. Ray Harrington, Jr.
Juan Carlos Harriott, Jr.
Willis L. Hartman
Henry Lloyd Herbert
Julian Hipwood
Louise Eustis Hitchcock
Thomas Hitchcock, Jr.
Thomas Hitchcock, Sr.
Glen Holden, Sr.
Philip L. B. Iglehart
Stewart B. Iglehart
S.K. (Skey) Johnston
Foxhall Parker Keene
Northrup R. Knox
Lewis Lacey
William R. Linfoot
William A. Mayer
Devereux Milburn
James P. Mills
John Murphy
George K. Oliver
Stephen A. Orthwein
John C. Oxley
John T. Oxley (polo)
Albert Parsells
Eric Leader Pedley
Peter Perkins
Michael Grace Phipps
Gonzalo Pieres
Billy Post
Owen Rinehart
Stephen J. Roberts
Will Rogers
Charles Cary Rumsey
Stephen "Laddie" Sanford
Robert Gould Shaw II
George C. Sherman, Jr.
William Sinclaire
Robert Skene
Cecil Smith (polo)
Charles Smith (polo)
Lewis A. Smith
Adam Snow
Malcolm Stevenson (polo)
Louis Ezekiel Stoddard
Robert Early Strawbridge, Jr.
Gonzalo Tanoira
Robert Uihlein, Jr.
Robert E. Walton
James Montaudevert Waterbury, Jr.
Lawrence Waterbury
Tommy Wayman
James Watson Webb, Sr.
Harry Payne Whitney
William T. Ylvisaker

See also
United States Polo Association

Footnotes

External links

Museum of Polo
Sports halls of fame
Halls of fame in Florida
Sports museums in Florida
Museums in Palm Beach County, Florida
Museum of Polo and Hall of Fame
Awards established in 1990
Museums established in 1988
Museum of Polo and Hall of Fame